The Ozias Goodwin House is a historic house at 7 Jackson Avenue in the North End of Boston, Massachusetts.  It is a two-story brick rowhouse, three bays wide, with brownstone window sills and lintels.  The second floor windows are set just below the eave, a typical Federal period detail.  The house was built in 1795, and is one of Boston's rare surviving Federal period houses.  It was owned by Ozias Goodwin a ship's captain active in the East Indies trade.

The house was listed on the National Register of Historic Places in 1988.

See also 
 National Register of Historic Places listings in northern Boston, Massachusetts

References

Houses completed in 1795
Houses in Boston
National Register of Historic Places in Boston
North End, Boston
Houses on the National Register of Historic Places in Suffolk County, Massachusetts
1795 establishments in Massachusetts